Sheffield is an unincorporated community in Pecos County, Texas, United States. According to the Handbook of Texas, the community had an estimated population of 600 in 2000.

Geography
Sheffield is located at the intersection of State Highway 290, State Highway 349, and FM 1217 on the eastern edge of Pecos County, about 16 miles southeast of Iraan and 60 miles east of Fort Stockton in eastern Pecos County.

History
The first documented Europeans to visit the area were Spanish explorer Gaspar Castaño de Sosa and his men, who traveled up the Pecos River in 1590.  Although several Spanish-led expeditions followed, no permanent settlements were established in the area.  In 1849, the Army surveyed the San Antonio-El Paso Road from San Antonio to El Paso, and the route included what is now Sheffield because of the Pecos Spring and the Pecos Crossing or Lancaster Crossing, named for the nearby Fort Lancaster.

An early pioneer in the area was William Franklin Smith, who herded sheep from the Sherwood area of Irion County to the Pecos River and camped at Pecos in the spring of 1886. Smith made several trips to Pecos County and eventually relocated permanently to Sheffield in 1912. The first settler was John Cannon, who arrived in 1888 and purchased a tract along the Pecos River. A post office was established in 1898, with Will Sheffield as its first postmaster. Around 1900, a small settlement sprang up on land adjoining the Cannon ranch owned by Mr. Sheffield, and the town became known as Sheffield. Most other settlers were ranchers who established their own homesteads. However, a few of the early pioneers were later reputed to be outlaws seeking a refuge far from the reach of the law. Black Jack Ketchum, later a notorious outlaw wanted in several states, was among these, spending time in the area in the 1890s. The town prospered in the early 1900s as a supply point and social center for surrounding ranchers. Sheffield became a small stop on the transcontinental route known as the Old Spanish Trail beginning in the 1920s. One of the local motels there was the OST Courts (The old sign for this establishment was still in place in 2015). The discovery of oil in the Trans-Pecos region during the 1920s radically altered the local economy. Sheffield became a stopping point for traveling motorists when the Old Spanish Trail  was developed through West Texas. The route later became U.S. Highway 290. Sheffield grew slowly, from an estimated 124 inhabitants in 1925 to 350 by 1949. Natural gas production was introduced in 1971. Although the community was bypassed by Interstate 10, Sheffield continued to support several stores and businesses throughout the latter half of the 20th century. In 2000, Sheffield was home to an estimated 600 inhabitants and 15 businesses.

Local resident Herbert A. Holmes, who came to Sheffield with his family in 1906, began collecting facts, recollections, and photographs about the small community. His son J. Wayne Holmes and he eventually published these in a small book entitled, Frontier Days in Sheffield, which he published in 1973.

Although Sheffield is unincorporated, it has a post office, with the ZIP code of 79781.

Education
Public education in the community of Sheffield is provided by the Iraan-Sheffield Independent School District.

References

External links

Iraan-Sheffield Chamber of Commerce

Unincorporated communities in Texas
Unincorporated communities in Pecos County, Texas
San Antonio–El Paso Road